The Woman from Berlin (German:Die Dame aus Berlin) is a 1925 German silent drama film directed by Lorand von Kabdebo and starring Werner Krauss, Lia Eibenschütz and William Dieterle.

The film's sets were designed by the art director Victor Trivas.

Cast
 Werner Krauss as Anton Zöllner  
 Lia Eibenschütz as Renate  
 William Dieterle as Wulf Tormann  
 Jaro Fürth as Dr. Berger  
 Jakob Tiedtke as Alter tormann  
 Eugen Rex as Fritz Lehner  
 Erra Bognar as Betty

References

Bibliography
 Grange, William. Cultural Chronicle of the Weimar Republic. Scarecrow Press, 2008.

External links

1925 films
Films of the Weimar Republic
German silent feature films
1925 drama films
German drama films
German black-and-white films
Silent drama films
1920s German films